Timothy S. Squyres is an American film editor with about 30 film credits. Squyres has had an extended collaboration with the Taiwanese director Ang Lee. His latest collaboration with Jonathan Demme on the film A Master Builder opened in New York during June 2014 and was based on the 19th century play by Henrik Ibsen.

Life and career
Squyres was born in Wenonah, New Jersey. He is the brother of Steve Squyres, a retired professor of astronomy at Cornell University and Chief Scientist at Blue Origin. Both brothers attended Cornell after attending Gateway Regional High School in New Jersey.

Squyres has edited all of Ang Lee's films except for Brokeback Mountain, including The Wedding Banquet (1993), Eat Drink Man Woman (1994), Sense and Sensibility (1995), Ride with the Devil (1999), Crouching Tiger, Hidden Dragon (2000), The Hire: Chosen (2001), Hulk (2003), Lust, Caution (2007), Taking Woodstock (2009) and Life of Pi (2012). Squyres served as editor of Angelina Jolie's adaptation of Unbroken, released on December 25, 2014.

Squyres' work on Crouching Tiger, Hidden Dragon (2000) earned nominations for the Academy Award for Best Film Editing, the BAFTA Award for Best Editing, the American Cinema Editors Eddie Award, among other awards. His work on Gosford Park (directed by Robert Altman – 2001) was also nominated for an Eddie.  In 2012, he was also nominated for the Academy Award for Life of Pi.

Squyres has been elected to membership in the American Cinema Editors.

Squyres is a resident of Maplewood, New Jersey.

See also
 List of film director and editor collaborations

References

External links 

 

American Cinema Editors
Cornell University alumni
Living people
People from Maplewood, New Jersey
People from Wenonah, New Jersey
American film editors
1959 births